Judith Sainte-Marie (1886–1970) was a Canadian painter.

Collections
Pierre-Zotique Sainte-Marie, father of the artist, 1912, Musée national des beaux-arts du Québec

References

1886 births
1970 deaths
People from Longueuil
Canadian women painters
Artists from Quebec